Bazzani is an Italian surname most common in the region of Emilia-Romagna, Italy Notable people with the surname include:

Cesare Bazzani (1873 - 1939), Italian architect
Domenico Conti Bazzani (1740-1817), Italian painter
Fabio Bazzani (born 1976), Italian footballer
Francesco Maria Bazzani (1650-1700), Italian baroque composer
Gaspare Bazzani (1701–1780), Italian painter
Giuseppe Bazzani (1690-1769), Italian painter
Luigi Bazzani (1836-1927), Italian painter, watercolorist, and theater set designer
Loris Bazzani (1984 - present), Italian computer scientist specialized in computer vision

Italian-language surnames